Saint Anselm's College may refer to:

 Saint Anselm College, a liberal arts college in Goffstown, New Hampshire
 St. Anselm's College, a grammar school in Merseyside, England

See also
Saint Anselm's (disambiguation)
St. Anselm's School (disambiguation)